Charles Weld may refer to:

 Charles Goddard Weld (1857–1911), Boston-area physician, sailor, philanthropist and art lover
 Charles Joseph Weld (1893–1962), officer in the British Indian Army
 Charles Richard Weld (1813–1869), English writer, known as a historian of the Royal Society